Alpine skiing at the 2019 Winter Universiade was held at the Funpark Bobrovy Log in Krasnoyarsk from 3 to 11 March 2019.

Men's events

Women's events

Team event

Medal table

References

External links
Results
Results Book – Alpine Skiing

 
Alpine skiing
Winter Universiade
2019